The Sheriff of Cochise is an American police crime drama television series of 79 black-and-white episodes broadcast from 1956 to 1958. The show has two seasons of 39 episodes, and there is an additional standalone episode. Each episode runs for 30 minutes. The series features John Bromfield as Frank Morgan, the sheriff of Cochise County, Arizona. The series is succeeded by U.S. Marshal, in which Morgan was promoted to be the United States marshal for Arizona.

Plot 
Frank Morgan is the sheriff of Cochise County, Arizona, and his duties force him to go after people breaking the law in his home county. These include robbers, thugs, con artists, killers, and other lawbreakers. The series is based on Westerns, though with a contemporary twist as in the neo-Western sub-genre. Morgan drives a Chrysler station wagon, rarely fights personally, and uses radios and fingerprints to aid in his investigations.

Cast

Main cast 
 John Bromfield as Frank Morgan, the sheriff of Cochise County, Arizona (79 episodes)
 Stan Jones as Harry Olson, a sheriff's deputy and Morgan's second-in-command (63 episodes)

Recurring cast

Guest Cast 
Chris Alcaide
Robert Fuller (actor)
Charles Bronson

References

External links 
 
 

1956 American television series debuts
1957 American television series endings
1950s American crime drama television series
1950s American police procedural television series
1950s Western (genre) television series
Television shows set in Cochise County, Arizona